The swimming competition at the 2018 Central American and Caribbean Games was held at the Aquatic Complex in Barranquilla, Colombia from 20 to 25 July. Open water swimming events were held on 28 and 29 July at Puerto Velero.

Medal summary

Men's events

 Swimmers who participated in the heats only and received medals.

Women's events

Mixed events

 Swimmers who participated in the heats only and received medals.

Medal table

References

External links
2018 Central American and Caribbean Games – Swimming
2018 Central American and Caribbean Games – Open water swimming
Results book – Swimming
Results book – Open water swimming

2018 Central American and Caribbean Games events
Central American and Caribbean Games
2018
International aquatics competitions hosted by Colombia
Qualification tournaments for the 2019 Pan American Games